Black Head is a headland at the western end of St Austell Bay, in Cornwall, England. It is owned by the National Trust.

Description
It is the site of an Iron Age promontory fort. The fort is a scheduled monument. There are also the remains of a rifle range, built in the 1880s and modified in later years.

A memorial stone for the Cornish writer A. L. Rowse is situated on Black Head. In retirement he lived in the nearby hamlet of Trenarren. The stone includes the inscription "This was the land of my content".

References

Hill forts in Cornwall
Headlands of Cornwall
Iron Age sites in Cornwall
Scheduled monuments in Cornwall
National Trust properties in Cornwall